Patra TV is a regional television station in the city of Patras, Greece.

History
The channel in the first period of operation had a long strike and television history. In 2001, with the change of ownership status, its technical equipment is completely changed. In 2006 the station started its first major problems with the consequent closure. Its unpaid employees occupied the station, broadcasting screens with their demands, but the ownership threw black on his signal from the mountains. A few 24 hours later, the channel reopened with a full program. However in 2008 the ownership again tends to close the station but only for one month, as the channel changed ownership and reopened.

On 2011 for the umpteenth time and several months unpaid employees re-occupied the station until October of that year when reopens fully but with less staff.

On February 3, 2012, becomes the first channel in Patras to start broadcasting digitally, while in December of that year, the remaining employees for the last time re-occupied the station which ceased broadcasting, something that typically happened shortly after his license was revoked.

On 17 November 2022, Patra TV relaunched replacing PLP (ex. Cosmos TV Ilia).

Ownership
The station had several owners, many of whom were leading to its closure. The company that managed and operated it was called Television of Patras S.A. (Τηλεόραση της Πάτρας Α.Ε.) which was established on April 26, 1999. On March 20, 1998, the channel's operation was legalized under the 6316/Ε license, by the Ministry for the Press. Its first headquarters are located on Georgiou Tertseti 21. The first owners were the Anemodouras and Konstantinopoulos families. On 2000, moved its headquarters on the Patras-Athens new national road, number 73 where it remained until its closure.

At the end of 2001 passed into the hands of the shipowner Adamantios Polemis, making the largest investment, reaching 4 million euros, which is a record for a Greek local television station. One of the founders remained in the new ownership as a advisor until 2005.

In 2008, during the period when the channel was closed, it changed ownership and passed into the hands of the publisher of the newspaper Gnomi tis Patras where he remained until the closure of the channel at the end of 2012. The new Patra TV is managed and operated by Cosmos Pelop Media S.A. which was established on 1997 with the operation of the predecessor channel called Cosmos in the prefecture of Elis and legalized on March 23, 1998 under the 6564/Ε license, by the Ministry for the Press.

Logo and slogan
Its logo was only written in the Greek alphabet. Later, the logo was changed and is in the Latin alphabet.

See also
List of Greek-language television channels
List of companies of Greece

References

External links
Patra TV - Alternative news website
Short movie: ATV in the news of Patras TV

Mass media in Patras
Defunct television channels in Greece
Television channels and stations established in 1989
Television channels and stations disestablished in 2012
1989 establishments in Greece